Ceretes thais is a moth in the Castniidae family. It is found in Brazil. Superficially it looks very like a butterfly, and was originally placed by Dru Drury in the "Papilio (Danaus Festivus)" group which mostly corresponds with modern Nymphalidae.

Description
Upper side: Antennae brown. Thorax, abdomen, and anterior wings red brown; the latter having two streaks or bars of a lighter colour crossing them from the anterior edges to the posterior and external ones; one crossing the middle of the wing, the other nearer the tips. Posterior wings orange; the lower part black along the external edge, whereon are placed a row of square orange coloured spots, those next the upper corners reaching to the edge; a black line also crosses these wings, beginning just below the body, and running almost across to the upper corner.

Under side: Palpi and thorax red-brown. Abdomen yellowish. Anterior wings yellowish clay coloured, with three black lines crossing them transversely, the middle one being the broadest. Posterior wings orange brown, with a small white spot placed near the centre. Margins of the wings plain. Wing-span  inches (64 mm).

References

Moths described in 1782
Castniidae